Julián Vitale (born 21 July 1995) is an Argentine professional footballer who plays as a midfielder for Alvarado.

Career
2015 saw Vitale start his professional as he was promoted into the first-team from the reserves. His debut for the club came on 31 May in a 1–0 win over Tigre at the Estadio Libertadores de América. On 27 August, Vitale made his continental debut in the 2015 Copa Sudamericana second stage first leg against fellow Argentine side Arsenal de Sarandí, a match that he also scored his first career goal in. In total, he made nineteen appearances in all competitions in his first season before making just one appearance in his second, in 2016. In the 2016–17 campaign, Vitale played in three of the club's first six fixtures.

On 2 August 2017, Vitale joined Unión Santa Fe on a season-long loan. He made his debut in the league versus Defensa y Justicia on 16 September. Newly-promoted Argentine Primera División team San Martín completed the loan capture of Vitale in June 2018. After returning, Independiente put him to train with the reserve team, having planned to sell him if a good bid arrived. As of January 2020, he was still training with the reserve team.  Vitale terminated his contract on 21 July, following an eighteen year association with the club. He subsequently joined Primera B Nacional's Alvarado.

Career statistics
.

References

External links

1995 births
Living people
Footballers from Buenos Aires
Argentine footballers
Association football midfielders
Argentine Primera División players
Club Atlético Independiente footballers
Unión de Santa Fe footballers
San Martín de Tucumán footballers
Club Atlético Alvarado players